Bybee may refer to:

Places
United States
 Bybee, Illinois
 Bybee, Kentucky
 Bybee, Tennessee
 Bybee, Virginia

Other uses
 Bybee (surname)
 Bybee Bridge
 Smith and Bybee Wetlands Natural Area
 Bybee–Howell House
 Bybee Pottery